Simon son of Boethus (also known as Simon son of Boëthus, Simeon ben Boethus or Shimon ben Boethus) was a Jewish High priest (ca. 23 – 4 BCE) in the 1st century BCE and father-in-law of Herod the Great. According to Josephus, he was also known by the name Cantheras. His family is believed to have been connected to the school of the Boethusians, and a family whose origins are from Alexandria in Egypt.

He succeeded Jesus, son of Fabus and was removed by Herod when his daughter, Mariamne II was implicated in the plot of Antipater against her husband in 4 BCE.  As a result, Herod divorced her and removed her father (Simon Boethus) as high priest.  Simon's  grandson Herod II was removed from the line of succession in Herod's last will.

See also
 Simon son of Joseph

References

1st-century BCE High Priests of Israel